Fire in the hole is a warning used in English-speaking countries to indicate that an explosive detonation in a confined space is imminent.

Fire in the Hole may also refer to:

Music
 Fire in the Hole (album), a 2004 album by Brand Nubian
 "Fire in the Hole" (1970), a song by Exuma from his album Exuma II
 "Fire in the Hole" (Steely Dan song), 1972
 "Fire in the Hole" (1994), a song by the Tragically Hip from their album Day for Night
 "Fire in the Hole" (Skid Row song), 1998
 "Fire in the Hole" (Van Halen song), 1998
 "Fire in the Hole" (2012), a song by Pegboard Nerds 
 "Fire in the Hole" (2015), a song by Marianas Trench
 "Five Finger Death Punch" (Five Finger Death Punch song), 2018

Television
 "Fire in the Hole" (Justified), the pilot episode of the American TV series Justified
 "Fire in the Hole", a season 1 episode of Ash vs Evil Dead
 "Fire in the Hole", a season 3 episode of The Shield

Other uses
 Fire in the Hole (Silver Dollar City), three story steel-enclosed roller coaster at Silver Dollar City, in Branson, Missouri, United States
"Fire in the Hole", a short story by Elmore Leonard, upon which the television series Justified is partly based
Fire in the Hole: And Other Stories (Raylan Givens Book 4), a short fiction collection by Elmore Leonard